Kanakumbi is a village in Belagavi district in Karnataka, India. It is situated on border of Satteri taluka, Goa. Near by cities are Belagavi city 45 km,Mapusa 65 km, Panaji 71 km.

This village is located at the Karnataka and Goa border. Kannada , Marathi and Konkani are the commonly used languages being Kannada as official language.

It is surrounded by a number of tourist spots. Lush green and numerous waterfalls is how this place looks during monsoon.

The Maadaayi (Maha Tayi or Great Mother in Kannada) stream originates from this village and so does the Malaprabha river.

References

Villages in Belagavi district